The Bari Grand Prix was a Grand Prix road race, held in Bari, Italy, between 1947 and 1956. In 1953 the race was not contested.

Winners

Bari Grand Prix circuits 1947–2011

Bibliography
Acerbi, Leonardo (2006). Ferrari: A Complete Guide to All Models. St. Paul: Motorbooks.
(1951). "Bari Race to Fangio." The New York Times. September 3.
(1956). "Moss Wins Bari Race." The New York Times. July 23.
Complete Bari Grand Prix results.
1956 Bari Grand Prix results.

External links
Bari Grand Prix - Lungomare Circuit on Google Maps (Historic Formula 1 Tracks)

 
Recurring sporting events established in 1947